Allium ramosum, called Fragrant-flowered Garlic or Chinese chives is a northern Asian species of wild onion native to Kazakhstan, Mongolia, Siberia, the Russian Far East, and northern China (Gansu, Hebei, Heilongjiang, Jilin, Liaoning, Inner Mongolia, Ningxia, Qinghai, Shaanxi, Shandong, Shanxi, Xinjiang).  The species is also naturalized in a few places in eastern Europe.  In its native range, it grows at elevations of 500–2100 m.

Allium ramosum has clusters of narrow bulbs. Scapes are up to 60 cm tall. Leaves are linear, keeled, shorter than the scape. Umbels have many flowers crowded together. Tepals are white or pale red with a red midvein.

Uses 
The plant is traditionally eaten in northern China and Mongolia. It is known as gogd in Mongolian, and is gathered between May and July, then preserved with salt for the winter. Gogd is then used to season boiled mutton, or stuffed into dumplings. It is also used to treat stomach ailments. The flowers, called soriz, are gathered in late July and August, and salted.

References

ramosum
Onions
Flora of temperate Asia
Plants described in 1753
Taxa named by Carl Linnaeus